The 2008 Arkansas Democratic presidential primary took place on Super Tuesday, February 5, 2008, with 35 delegates at stake. The winner in each of Arkansas's four congressional districts was awarded all of that district's delegates, totaling 22. Another 13 delegates were awarded to the statewide winner, Hillary Clinton. The 35 delegates represented Arkansas at the Democratic National Convention in Denver, Colorado. Twelve other unpledged delegates, known as superdelegates, also attended the convention and cast their votes as well.

Polling

Results

Analysis
Arkansas, the state where Hillary Clinton served as First Lady during her husband Bill Clinton’s tenure as governor, gave Clinton her largest victory during the course of the Democratic Primary. She swept the state among every major demographic – age, gender, religion, income, and educational attainment. According to exit polls, 80 percent of voters in the Arkansas Democratic Primary were Caucasian and they opted for Clinton by a margin of 79-16 compared to the 17 percent of African Americans who backed Obama by a margin of 74–25.

Clinton carried every county in Arkansas by nearly two-to-one margins with the exception of three counties won by Obama: Crittenden, which contains West Memphis and is a part of the Memphis Metropolitan Area; and Lee and Phillips counties, both predominantly African American and located along the Mississippi River Delta.

See also
 2008 Arkansas Republican presidential primary

References

2008 United States Democratic presidential primaries by state
Democratic presidential primary
2008
2008 Super Tuesday